Wasteland is an American drama that aired on ABC from October 7 until October 21, 1999. The show was created by Kevin Williamson.
It explored such topics as college, friendships, romance and homosexuality.
It aired only three episodes in October 1999 before ABC canceled it. However, Showtime's ShowNext channel aired the 10 remaining episodes in 2001.

Summary
Wasteland tells the story of six friends after college. Dawnie is a graduate student writing a thesis on the "Lost Generation", and at 27, she is standing strong as a virgin. Alongside are her two best female friends: Sam, a sassy social worker, and Jesse, a publicist obsessed with the downtown dating scene. Other characters include Vandy, a musician by day, bartender by night who still carries a torch for Sam, Ty, who reappears after dumping Dawnie for not "putting out", and Russell, a gay soap opera star terrified of being out and Ty's college roommate.

Cast
 Sasha Alexander as Jesse Presser
 Marisa Coughlan as Dawnie Parker
 Rebecca Gayheart as Samantha 'Sam' Price
 Eddie Mills as Vandy
 Dan Montgomery Jr. as Russell Baskind
 Brad Rowe as Tyler 'Ty' Swindell
 Jeffrey D. Sams as Vincent 'Vince' Lewis

Notable guest appearances

 Adam Scott as Phillip The Coffee Boy
 Benjamin Markham as Gothic Bill

Episodes

References

External links
 

American Broadcasting Company original programming
1999 American television series debuts
1990s American LGBT-related drama television series
1999 American television series endings
1990s American drama television series
Television shows set in New York City
Television series by Disney–ABC Domestic Television
Television series by Miramax Television
Television series created by Kevin Williamson